Nav Canada (styled as NAV CANADA) is a privately run, not-for-profit corporation that owns and operates Canada's civil air navigation system (ANS). It was established in accordance with the Civil Air Navigation Services Commercialization Act (ANS Act).

The company employs approximately 1,900 air traffic controllers (ATCs), 650 flight service specialists (FSSs) and 700 technologists. It has been responsible for the safe, orderly and expeditious flow of air traffic in Canadian airspace since November 1, 1996 when the government transferred the ANS from Transport Canada to Nav Canada. As part of the transfer, or privatization, Nav Canada paid the government CA$1.5 billion.

Nav Canada manages 12 million aircraft movements a year for 40,000 customers in over 18 million square kilometres, making it the world's second-largest air navigation service provider (ANSP) by traffic volume.

Nav Canada, which operates independently of any government funding, is headquartered in Ottawa, Ontario.  It is only allowed to be funded by publicly traded debt and service charges to aircraft operators.

Facilities

Nav Canada's operations consist of various sites across the country. These include:
About 1,400 ground-based navigation aids
55 flight service stations
7 flight information centres, one each in:
 Kamloops – most of British Columbia
 Edmonton – all of Alberta and northeastern BC
 Winnipeg – northwestern Ontario, all of Manitoba and Saskatchewan
 London – most of Ontario
 Quebec City – all of Quebec, southwestern Labrador, tip of eastern Ontario, northern New Brunswick
 Halifax – most of New Brunswick, Nova Scotia, Prince Edward Island, and most of Newfoundland and Labrador
 Whitehorse – northwestern British Columbia and all of Yukon
41 control towers
46 radar sites and 15 automatic dependent surveillance-broadcast (ADS-B) ground sites
7 area control centres, one each in:
 Vancouver (CZVR) – Surrey, BC
 Edmonton (CZEG) – Edmonton International Airport
 Winnipeg (CZWG) – Winnipeg-James Armstrong Richardson International Airport
 Toronto Centre (CZYZ) – Toronto-Pearson International Airport
 Montreal Centre (CZUL) – Montreal-Trudeau International Airport
 Moncton (CZQM) – Riverview, New Brunswick
 Gander (CZQX) – Gander International Airport
North Atlantic Oceanic control centre: Gander Control

Nav Canada has three other facilities:
National Operations Centre: Ottawa (77 Metcalfe Street)
Technical Systems Centre: Ottawa (280 Hunt Club Road)
The Nav Centre (formerly the Nav Canada Training and Conference Centre) – 1950 Montreal Road in Cornwall, Ontario

Corporate governance

As a non-share capital corporation, Nav Canada has no shareholders. The company is governed by a 15-member board of directors representing the four stakeholder groups that founded Nav Canada. The four stakeholders elect 10 members as follows:

These 10 directors then elect four independent directors, with no ties to the stakeholder groups. Those 14 directors then appoint the president and chief executive officer who becomes the 15th board member.

This structure ensures that the interests of individual stakeholders do not predominate and no member group could exert undue influence over the remainder of the board. To further ensure that the interests of Nav Canada are served, these board
members cannot be active employees or members of airlines, unions, or government.

History

The company began operations on November 1, 1996 when the government sold the country's air navigation services from Transport Canada to the new not-for-profit private entity for CAD$1.5 billion.

The company was formed in response to a number of issues with Transport Canada's (TC) operation of air traffic control and air navigation facilities. While TC's safety record and operational staff were rated highly, its infrastructure was old and in need of serious updating at a time of government restraint. This resulted in system delays for airlines and costs that were exceeding the airline ticket tax, a directed tax that was supposed to fund the system. The climate of government wage freezes resulted in staff shortages of air traffic controllers that were hard to address within a government department. Having TC as the service provider, the regulator and inspector was a conflict of interest. Pressure from the airlines on the government mounted for a solution to the problem that was hurting the air industry's bottom line.

A number of solutions were considered, including forming a crown corporation, but rejected in favour of outright privatization, the new company being formed as a non-share-capital not-for-profit, run by a board of directors who were initially appointed and now elected.

The company's revenue is predominantly from service fees charged to aircraft operators which amount to about CAD$1.2B annually. Nav Canada also raises revenues from developing and selling technology and related services to other air navigation service providers around the world. It also has some smaller sources of income, such as conducting maintenance work for other ANS providers and rentals from the Nav Centre in Cornwall, Ontario.

To address the old infrastructure it purchased from the Canadian government the company has carried out projects such as implementing a wide area multilateration (WAM) system, replacing 95 Instrument Landing System (ILS) installations with new equipment, new control towers in Toronto, Edmonton and Calgary, modernizing the Vancouver Area Control Centre and building a new logistics centre

Late 2000s recession
Nav Canada felt the impact of the late-2000s recession in two ways: losses in its investments in third party sponsored asset-backed commercial paper (ABCP) and falling revenues due to reduced air traffic levels. In the summer of 2007 the company held $368 million in ABCP which had become illiquid. On 12 January 2009 final Ontario Superior Court of Justice approval was granted to restructure the third party ABCP notes. The company expects that the non-credit related fair value variances from face value on restructured and non-restructured ABCP (amounting cumulatively to $33 at November 30, 2013) will be recovered by the time the notes mature in fiscal year 2017. By fiscal year end 2013, the company's revenues reached $1,231 million, which exceeded its pre-recession level and fiscal year 2014 saw further revenue growth to $1,272 million. During the period 2005-15 the company held service charge rates steady.

Hudson Bay ADS-B deployment
In the mid-2000s the company decided to address the lack of radar coverage in the Canadian north, especially in the area of Hudson Bay where airliners transition from the North Atlantic Tracks system to Canadian Domestic Airspace by deploying a ground-based Automatic Dependent Surveillance-Broadcast (ADS-B) network. The five station network was operational on 15 January 2009, filling a  gap in radar coverage which allowed reduced separation of airline flights by ADS-B tracking over procedural separation.

In November 2010, a second set of six ground-based ADS-B transceivers was later deployed along the coast of Labrador and Nunavut, providing an additional .

Space-based ADS-B
In 2012, Nav Canada and the satellite communications company Iridium Communications Inc. launched a joint venture that will offer air traffic control authorities the ability to track aircraft around the globe in real time.

The joint venture, called Aireon LLC, will use Automatic Dependent Surveillance-Broadcast (ADS-B) receivers installed as an additional payload on 66 Iridium NEXT second-generation satellites scheduled to be launched between 2015 and 2017. 
Nav Canada plans to invest $150 million for a controlling stake in Aireon. That sum is being paid through a series of installments ending in 2017 and will give Nav Canada a 51 per cent stake in the joint venture.

The cross-linked Low Earth Orbit (LEO) satellites will, for the first time, make it possible to track aircraft from pole-to-pole, including oceanic airspace and remote regions, facilitating fuel savings, greenhouse gas emissions reduction, and enhanced safety and efficiency for airspace users.
The added surveillance that Aireon will provide will enable air traffic control to significantly reduce the separation standard in oceanic and other unsurveilled airspace from approximately 80 nautical miles (nm) to 15 nms or less. This will allow more aircraft to fly at optimum altitudes and to benefit from the prevailing winds such as the jet stream, saving fuel and reducing greenhouse gas emissions.

Aireon CEO Don Thoma estimates that this will result in an average fuel savings of $400 per flight for the three-and-a-half-hour trip across the North Atlantic. The annual fuel cost savings for airlines in the North Atlantic alone will be in the order of $125 million.

In December 2013, ANSPs from three additional countries joined Nav Canada as partners in Aireon. Enav of Italy, the Irish Aviation Authority and Denmark's Naviair signed on for a combined investment of $120 million resulting in a new ownership structure for the company with Nav Canada holding 51 per cent, Iridium with 24.5 per cent, Enav at 12.5 per cent and the Irish Aviation Authority and Naviair each holding 6%.

In September 2014 Aireon announced plans to offer ALERT (Aircraft Locating and Emergency Response Tracking), a free supplementary service for emergency tracking of aircraft in trouble. Aireon's ADS-B receivers on Iridium's satellites will already include ALERT's capabilities and the company has decided to make it available free of charge “as a public service.” Aireon ALERT could be activated by any certified air-safety organization to request the last known location and flight path of any aircraft carrying an ADS-B transponder, even if the operator does not subscribe to Aireon.

Fleet
Nav Canada operates a small fleet of aircraft. These aircraft are mainly used for flight inspection of navigation equipment and procedures. As of February 2023, Nav Canada had two Bombardier CL-600 registered with Transport Canada and operate as ICAO airline designator NVC, and telephony NAV CAN.

Nav Canada previously operated two other Bombardier CL-600s and a Bombardier Dash-8 Series 100 for the same purposes until April 2019.

References

External links

Air traffic control in Canada
Air navigation service providers
Air traffic controller schools
Non-profit organizations based in Ontario
Organizations based in Ottawa
Organizations established in 1996
1996 establishments in Canada